Mitrula paludosa (syn. Mitrula phalloides), the swamp beacon (US) or bog beacon, (UK) is a species of fungus. It is inedible.

Habitat
These mushrooms are found in swamps and bogs across North America in the cooler climates of south-eastern Canada, New England south to the Mason–Dixon line, and much of the mid-western United States. Also present in Europe from the British Isles to Eastern Europe.

On the West Coast of the United States, the Mitrula elegans looks similar.

Identification
Many related species of Mitrula look identical without microscopic study. The cap or club is yellow with a white stalk (possibly with some pink coloration). It is around 2-3 mm wide, and up to 4 cm tall.

References

External links
Images of the bog beacon in the UK
Bog beacon locations in Northern Ireland
Photographs with many European language translations of the name

Helotiales
Fungi of Europe
Fungi of North America

Inedible fungi